County Longford was a constituency represented in the Irish House of Commons from 1585 to 1800 representing County Longford. Between 1725 and 1793, under the Penal Laws, Catholics and those married to Catholics could not vote.

Members of Parliament

1585–1666

1689 (Patriot Parliament)

1692–1801

References

Historic constituencies in County Longford
Constituencies of the Parliament of Ireland (pre-1801)
1800 disestablishments in Ireland
Constituencies disestablished in 1800